Kullervo is an ill-fated character in the Kalevala, the Finnish national epic.

Kullervo may also refer to:

Kullervo (Sallinen), opera by Aulis Sallinen
Kullervo (Sibelius), choral symphony by Jean Sibelius
Kullervo (given name)

See also